The quarterfinals of the 2006-07 Euroleague were the third of four stages of the annual Europe-wide club basketball competition.

Each quarterfinal was a best-of-three series between a first-place team in the Top 16 and a second-place team from a different group, with the first-place team receiving home advantage. Quarterfinals were played on April 3 and April 5, 2007, with third games played April 12 if necessary.

The winning teams advanced to the Final Four, held May 4 through May 6, 2007 at the Olympic Indoor Hall in Athens.

Quarterfinal 1

Results

Statistics

Total score: TAU Cerámica 179–148 Olympiacos.

Leading scorer: 41 points - Igor Rakočević , TAU Cerámica (1st game - 24 po., 2nd game - 17 po.)

Leading rebounder: 19 rebounds (DEF - 14, OFF - 5) - Luis Scola , TAU Cerámica (1st game - 9 reb., 2nd game - 10 reb.)

Assists leader: 8 assists - Scoonie Penn , Olympiacos (1st game - 3 ass., 2nd game - 5 ass.)

Leading shot blocker: 3 blocks - Luis Scola , TAU Cerámica (2nd game - 3 blocks).

Steals leader: 5 steals - 5 players.

Quarterfinal 2

Results

Statistics

Total score: CSKA Moscow 228–197 Maccabi Tel Aviv.

Leading scorer: 47 points - Trajan Langdon , CSKA Moscow (1st game - 16 po. 2nd game - 11 po. 3rd game - 20 po.)

Leading rebounder: 23 rebounds (DEF - 18, OFF - 4) - Nikola Vujčić , Maccabi Tel Aviv (1st game - 9 reb. 2nd game - 9 reb. 3rd game - 4 reb.)

Assists leader: 21 assists - Theodoros Papaloukas , CSKA Moscow (1st game - 8 ass. 2nd game - 3 ass. 3rd game - 10 ass.)

Leading shot blocker: 4 blocks - Thomas van den Spiegel , CSKA Moscow (1st game - 2 blocks, 3rd game - 2 blocks).

Steals leader: 6 steals - 2 players.

Quarterfinal 3

Results

Statistics

Total score: Panathinaikos 153–123 Dynamo Moscow.

Leading scorer: 35 points - Ramūnas Šiškauskas , Panathinaikos (1st game - 16 po. 2nd game - 19 po.)

Leading rebounder: 13 rebounds (DEF - 7, OFF - 6) - Lazaros Papadopoulos , Dynamo Moscow (1st game - 7 reb. 2nd game - 6 reb.)

Assists leader: 7 assists - Dimitris Diamantidis , Panathinaikos (1st game - 6 ass. 2nd game - 1 ass.)

Leading shot blocker: 4 blocks - Dimitris Diamantidis , Panathinaikos (1st game - 3 blocks, 2nd game - 1 block).

Steals leader: 3 steals - 2 players.

Quarterfinal 4

Results

Statistics

Total score: Unicaja Málaga 216–219 Winterthur FCB.

Leading scorer: 49 points - Juan Carlos Navarro , Winterthur FCB (1st game - 15 po. 2nd game - 25 po. 3rd game - 9 po.)

Leading rebounder: 20 rebounds (DEF - 15, OFF - 5) - Jordi Trias , Winterthur FCB (1st game - 5 reb. 2nd game - 6 reb. 3rd - 9 reb.)

Assists leader: 10 assists - 2 players.

Leading shot blocker: 4 blocks - Iñaki de Miguel , Unicaja Málaga (2nd game - 1 block, 3rd game - 3 blocks).

Steals leader: 4 steals - 2 players.

Quarterfinals
2006–07 in Spanish basketball
2006–07 in Greek basketball
2006–07 in Russian basketball
2006–07 in Israeli basketball